XHFCE-FM (Radio Huayacocotla: La Voz de los Campesinos – "The Voice of the Campesinos") is an indigenous community radio station based in Huayacocotla, a community of some 4000 inhabitants in the mountainous north of the Mexican state of Veracruz.

It began broadcasting, with a permit on 2390 kHz, a short wave frequency, on August 15, 1965 as XEJN-OC ("OC" for onda corta), using a 500 W transmitter. On February 14, 2005, the Secretariat of Communications and Transport (SCT) granted the station a legal permit after 27 years of negotiations, assigning it the call sign XHFCE-FM and an FM frequency of 105.5 MHz.

In its early years, the station's programming focused on adult literacy and numeracy efforts before evolving toward a more general community-radio format: local information, regional cultural dissemination, agricultural news, campesino rights. It carries programming in both Spanish and the local indigenous languages.

External links
 La Voz Campesina Facebook

References

¿Quién es “La voz de los campesinos” en Sierra Norte de Veracruz?
Entregan permiso a Radio Huayacocotla en la banda de FM

Community radio stations in Mexico
Radio stations in Veracruz
Indigenous radio stations in Mexico
Radio stations established in 1965